The Golden Arena awards were established in 1955 as the Yugoslav national film awards, presented annually at the Pula Film Festival. From 1955 to 1990 the awards were given for highest achievements in Yugoslav cinema. In 1991 the festival was cancelled due to the breakup of Yugoslavia, only to resume in 1992 as the Croatian film awards festival. It has been held every year since (with the exception of the 1994 edition which was also cancelled). 

Since each Pula Film Festival includes screenings of all the locally produced feature films made in the preceding 12 months (which is made possible due to the local film industry's relatively low output), everyone involved in making them is considered automatically qualified for the Golden Arena award. Therefore there are no Academy Award-style shortlists of nominees announced prior to the actual awarding ceremony, although some festival editions did award runner-up acting awards, called Silver Arena. 

The awards are given by the jury of five or six members, usually consisting of prominent filmmakers and film critics. Some festival editions also had Best Actor winners as voted by audiences, but these are not considered Golden Arena awards. Also, in the 1950s and 1960s awards in the acting category were given for actors' whole body of work in the preceding year so some of the more prolific recipients are officially listed as having won the Golden Arena award for several films made that year.

List of winners
The following is a list of winners of the Golden Arena for Best Actor at the Pula Film Festival.

Yugoslav competition (1955–1990)

Croatian competition (1992–present)

Multiple winners
The following actors have received multiple awards. The list is sorted by the number of total awards. Years in bold indicate wins in Yugoslavian competition (1955–1990).

4 :  Ljuba Tadić (1956, 1964, 1968, 1975)
4 :  Ivo Gregurević (1999, 2002, 2005, 2014)
4 :  Rade Šerbedžija (1978, 1986, 2010, 2020)
3 :  Bata Živojinović (1965, 1967, 1972)
3 :  Ljubiša Samardžić (1973, 1980, 1982)
3 :  Filip Šovagović (1995, 1998, 2001)
3 :  Rene Bitorajac (2009, 2012, 2021)
2 :  Pavle Vuisić (1958, 1977)
2 :  Boris Dvornik (1969, 1979)
2 :  Miki Manojlović (1983, 1985)
2 :  Ilija Ivezić (1993, 2000)
2 :  Emir Hadžihafizbegović (2007, 2015)
2 :  Krešimir Mikić (2006, 2019)

References

External links
Web archive 1954–2010 at the Pula Film Festival official website 

Pula Film Festival
Film awards for lead actor